The Hidden Lakes are a pair of glacial tarns in the Ruby Mountains, in Elko County in the northeastern part of the state of Nevada.

Hidden Lakes are two of the many sources of Soldier Creek, which flows from the eastern side of the Ruby Mountains through Soldier Canyon, exits the mountains to the west into Lamoille Valley, and then merges with the main branch of the Humboldt River. Soldier Lakes are in middle ground of photo.

References

Lakes of Elko County, Nevada
Ruby Mountains
Hidden
Lakes of the Great Basin